The K-9 (NATO reporting name AA-4 'Awl') was a short-range air-to-air missile developed by the Soviet Union in the late 1950s. It was designed by MKB Raduga, a division of aircraft maker Mikoyan-Gurevich. The K-9 was also known as the K-155, and would apparently have had the service designation R-38. It was intended to arm the Mikoyan-Gurevich Ye-152A (NATO reporting name 'Flipper'), an experimental high speed twin-engine aircraft, predecessor to the Mikoyan-Gurevich MiG-25 'Foxbat'. When the Ye-152A was shown at Tushino in 1961, a prototype of the K-9 missile was displayed with it.

Neither the 'Flipper' nor the 'Awl' ever entered production.

Notes

References
 

Air-to-air missiles of the Soviet Union
Cold War air-to-air missiles of the Soviet Union
MKB Raduga products